Micropycnodon is an extinct genus of prehistoric ray-finned fish that lived during the Santonian.

See also

 Prehistoric fish
 List of prehistoric bony fish

References

Pycnodontiformes genera
Late Cretaceous fish of Asia
Late Cretaceous fish of North America